Skovgaard is a surname meaning "Forest Farm". Notable people with the surname include:

Andreas Skovgaard, Danish footballer
Axel Skovgaard, Danish violinist
Christian John Skovgaard, Danish badminton player
Georgia Skovgaard (1828–1868), Danish embroiderer 
Irene Skovgaard, Danish author and composer 
Joakim Skovgaard, Danish painter
Niels Skovgaard, Danish painter and sculptor
P. C. Skovgaard, Danish painter
Steen Skovgaard, Danish badminton player
Suzette Skovgaard, see Suzette Holten, Danish painter